Sania Sultana Liza better known by her nickname Liza, is a singer from Bangladesh whose songs has been featured in different albums and movies. Liza was the winner of the musical reality show Close Up-1 at NTV in 2008.

Biography 
Liza took up singing lessons at the age of seven, her first teacher was M A Hye who taught her the basics. Afterwards Liza learned lessons from Anwar Hossain Anu, a teacher of Mymensingh Shilpakala Academy. This learned man taught her classical and modern songs. Her participation in the media started in 2004 through performing in the Notun Kuri Competition at Bangladesh Television. 

She passed SSC in 2008 from Gouripur Pilot Girls High School from commerce group. She passed HSC in 2010 from Shahid Syed Nazrul Islam College, Mymensingh. She completed her BBA from Daffodil International University in 2015.

Liza participated in music and sports at high school and during brief periods at college in Mymensingh and later around the world. In 2004, she achieved the position of "Runner-Up" in Badminton of Jatiyo Shishu Kriya Protijogita based on age. She was the "Champion" in Badminton based on age of Jatiyo Shishu Kriya Protijogita in greater Mymensingh district for 06 years (2005-2010). She also got "Silver Medal" in Hamdth – Nath competition based on age which is arranged by Islamic Foundation Bangladesh in 2006. She has received the "Gold Medal" in the National Music Competition and Jatiyo Shishu Polli Geeti Competition in 2006.

Close Up-1
In 2008, the third talent hunt organised by Closeup1 was held. The contest began in June and around 86,000 contestants were selected in the primary rounds from all over the country. From them 541 got the opportunity to take part in the main contest. At the third selection 115 were selected. From the 115, 42 were singled out. From 42 only the top 16 were chosen. Liza was the winner of Close Up-1.

On December 17 the grand finale of “CloseUp1: Tomakei Khujchhey Bangladesh 2008” was held. The winner was selected based on a point system that included both marks given by the judges and public votes (through SMS). As the winner, Liza received Tk 10 lakh and a car.

Music career
In 2008, Liza won the musical talent hunt Close Up-1. Liza's first solo album, Tausif ft Liza Part 1,  was released on 12 July 2012. Her second solo album, Pagli Suraiya was released on 17 July 2015. Liza also did Playback in over 50 Bangladeshi Films. She has sung in over 50 mixed album. She is the first Bangladeshi female singer that her music video on aired on UK-based Bollywood music channel B4U Music.

Liza is also a TV host in Bangladesh. She has hosted over 10 regular TV shows about music on Bangladeshi satellite TV channels.

Solo albums

Filmography 
 Eito Bhalobasha (2012)
 O Amar Desher Mati (2012)
 Taarkata (2014)
 Cheleti Abol Tabol Meyeti Pagol Pagol (2015)
 Bhola To Jay Na Tare (2015)
 Aina Shundory (2015)
 Kata (2016)  
 Prethatta (2016)
 Sultana Bibiana (2017)
 Gohin Baluchor (2017)
 Abbas (2019)
 Joy Nogorer Jomidar (2020)
 Shoshurbari Zindabad 2 (2022)

Singles

Awards 
 2008- Close Up-1(Champion)
 2014- AJFB Awards (Best Singer Female)
 2015- Dallywood Awards (Best Singer Female)
 2022- Star Plus Communication Awards (Best Singer Female)

References

External links 

 

Living people
21st-century Bangladeshi women singers
21st-century Bangladeshi singers
1993 births
People from Mymensingh District
G-Series (record label) artists